The Argentine Air Force Mobile Field Hospital is a field hospital operated by the Argentine Air Force. Established on August 21, 1981, it is one of three health centres of its kind worldwide.

Description 
The unit has a 64-member staff personnel between military and civilians and is made up of 14 containers Pictorial which, when fully assembled, occupy an area of 360 m2. Fourteen flights of C-130 Hercules aircraft are needed to fully deploy the Hospital.

Among the services provided by the Hospital are general clinic, surgery, dentistry, pharmacy, etc. The Hospital has its own laboratory, water purification plant and power generation engine.

Thanks to its isolation, the construction can withstand temperatures from -15 to 40 degrees Celsius and can endure harsh tremors as demonstrated when it remained operational after the earthquake of January 2010 in Haiti.

Deployments 

 1981 : San Luis Province
 1982 : Comodoro Rivadavia during the Falklands War
 1983 : Chaco and Formosa provinces
 1984-1986 : Buenos Aires province
 1993-1995 : Mozambique under United Nations mandate
 2000-2003 : Kosovo Force (KFOR) under NATO mandate 
 2004 : Deployment to Afghanistan aborted due Hurricane Jeanne: Deployed to Haiti instead.
 2004–2017 : MINUSTAH medical facility in Haiti ( Google Maps, picture)
 2010 feb/sep : Curicó after the Chile earthquake video Chile

2010 Haiti earthquake 

On January 12, 2010 while deployed at Port-au-Prince serving as medical facility for MINUSTAH troops the hospital was the only one still opened following the earthquake treating nearly 1,000 people on the first night

Both U.S. presidents Barack Obama and Bill Clinton congratulated Argentina for the Hospital quick response in the first critical hours after the earthquake  The same did Secretary of State Hillary Clinton during her visit to Buenos Aires on 1 March 2010

References 
 La Fuerza Aérea dará apoyo sanitario en Puerto Príncipe
 El hospital argentino en Haití, un reflejo de los dramas cotidianos
 Un hospital es blanco del conflicto étnico

External links 
 
 Hospital Reubicable at defesanet.com.br 

Military hospitals
Hospitals in Argentina
Argentine Air Force
2010 Haiti earthquake relief
Military units and formations of Argentina in the Falklands War